This article lists the Common Wealth Party's election results in UK parliamentary elections.

Summary of general election performance

Elections results

By-elections, 1943–45

1945 general election

References

F. W. S. Craig, Chronology of British Parliamentary By-elections 1833-1987

Common Wealth Party
Election results by party in the United Kingdom